Beardius is a genus of Pan-American non-biting midges in the subfamily Chironominae of the bloodworm family Chironomidae. It is named after the late Melvin Beard, a student at Eastern New Mexico University.

Species

B. abbadi Pinho, Mendes & Andersen, 2013
B. aciculatus Andersen & Sæther, 1996
B. arawak Pinho, Mendes & Andersen, 2013
B. bizzoi Pinho, Mendes & Andersen, 2013
B. breviculus Reiss & Sublette, 1985
B. bucephalus Pinho, Mendes & Andersen, 2013
B. chapala Pinho, Mendes & Andersen, 2013
B. cristhinae Trivinho-Strixino & Siqueira, 2007
B. curticaudatus Pinho, Mendes & Andersen, 2013
B. dioi Pinho, Mendes & Andersen, 2013
B. fittkaui Pinho, Mendes & Andersen, 2009
B. hirtidorsum Pinho, Mendes & Andersen, 2013
B. krenak Pinho, Mendes & Andersen, 2013
B. kumadueni Pinho, Mendes & Andersen, 2013
B. lingulatus Andersen & Sæther, 1996
B. longicaudatus Pinho, Mendes & Andersen, 2013
B. mileneae Pinho, Mendes & Andersen, 2013
B. nebularius Pinho, Mendes & Andersen, 2013
B. neusae Pinho, Mendes & Andersen, 2013
B. novoairensis Pinho, Mendes & Andersen, 2013
B. parcus Reiss & Sublette, 1985
B. phoenix Pinho, Mendes & Andersen, 2013
B. phytophilus Trivinho-Strixino & Strixino, 2000
B. reissi Jacobsen, 2000
B. roquei Trivinho-Strixino & Siqueira, 2007
B. sapiranga Pinho, Mendes & Andersen, 2013
B. triangulatus Andersen & Sæther, 1996
B. truncatus Reiss & Sublette, 1985
B. tupinamba Pinho, Mendes & Andersen, 2013
B. urupeatan Pinho, Mendes & Andersen, 2009
B. vanessae Pinho, Mendes & Andersen, 2013
B. xylophilus Trivinho-Strixino & Strixino, 2000
B. yperoig Pinho, Mendes & Andersen, 2013

References

Chironomidae